Crocodile Shoes is an album by Jimmy Nail consisting of "original songs from the BBC Television serial" of the same name. It was released in 1994 by East West Records and peaked at number two on the UK Albums Chart. It was the Christmas number two album that year.

Track listing
"Crocodile Shoes" - written by Tony McAnaney
"Calling Out Your Name" - written by Jimmy Nail
"Cowboy Dreams" - written by Paddy McAloon
"Once Upon a Time" - written by Jimmy Nail 
"Only One Heart" - written by Croker and Nail
"Bitter and Twisted" - written by Jimmy Nail
"Love Will Find Someone for You" - written by Paddy McAloon
"Angel" - written by Nail
"Between a Woman and a Man" - written by Nail
"Don't Wanna Go Home" - written by Nail
"Dragons" - written by Paddy McAloon

Chart performance

Personnel
Jimmy Nail - vocals, harmonica, Hammond organ
Tony McAnaney - guitar, bass guitar, harmonica, bouzouki 
Trevor Brewis - drums (tracks: 1,3,8)
Paul Smith - drums, percussion
Geoff Dugmore - drums
Phil Palmer - guitar
John Giblin - bass
Paul Wickens - keyboards (tracks: 7, 10)
B. J. Cole - pedal steel guitar
Marcus Brown - keyboards, accordion, programming
Steve Robson - fiddle, ocarina
Danny Cummings - tambourine
Dave Taggart, Margo Buchanan, Monica Reed-Price, Shirley Lewis - backing vocals
Mixed by Jimmy Nail, Jon Kelly

References

1994 albums
Jimmy Nail albums
Albums produced by Jon Kelly
East West Records albums